Pima Butte is a mountain summit in Pinal County, Arizona eight miles north of present-day Maricopa, Arizona. As a significant landmark in the Gila Valley it was near the site of the 1857 Battle of Pima Butte, to which it gave its name.

References

External links
 Pima Butte, Arizona on USGS 1:24K topographic map Pima Butte, AZ. on www.topoquest.com

Landforms of Pinal County, Arizona